Ranjeev Sharma (born 3 January 1973) is an Indian former cricketer. He played in two first-class and two List A matches for Punjab in the 1994/95 season. He is now an umpire and stood in a match in the 2020–21 Syed Mushtaq Ali Trophy.

See also
 List of Punjab cricketers (India)

References

External links
 

1973 births
Living people
Indian cricketers
Indian cricket umpires
Punjab, India cricketers
Place of birth missing (living people)